The following is a list of Interstate Highways in Maryland. There are currently 16 Interstate Highways that exist entirely or partially in the U.S. state of Maryland. Six of these are primary interstates while ten are auxiliary interstates related to one of the primary interstates. I-97 is also the only primary interstate to be located entirely within one county and to not connect with any other primary interstate. All interstates are maintained by the Maryland State Highway Administration except for all of I-395, all of I-895, a small part of I-695, I-95 within and north of Baltimore, and I-83 within Baltimore. Maryland has one unsigned interstate, I-595; that highway is marked as U.S. Route 50 and US 301, which are concurrent with I-595 for its entire length. Maryland has three former interstates which are shaded in dark gray in the list.

See also

References

 
Interstate highways